Waiheke United AFC is a football club based at Onetangi Sports Park on Waiheke Island, Auckland, New Zealand.  The Senior Men's Team currently play in the NRFL Championship, having been relegated in 2022.

History
Waiheke United is a New Zealand registered charity and an incorporated society that was formed in 1987 when the local junior and senior teams combined to become Waiheke United AFC. Since its inception the dedication of the club's committee members and volunteers, players and parents has seen the club thrive and grow to become one of the largest sports club on Waiheke Island.

Teams
Waiheke United covers all ages from First Kicks and Fun Football, Junior, youth and Senior men's and women's. The club has one senior Women's team, a senior Men's team, a reserve team, and an over 40's senior social team.

As of September 2017 the senior Men's first team has enjoyed particular success, winning six consecutive promotions in a row - Most recently winning promotion to Northern League.

Players and Supporters
The senior Men's team is made up of players from a range of nationalities with French, Japanese, Mexican, Uruguayan and Argentinians as well as New Zealanders cited amongst their squad.

Players and supporters from around the world have discovered the club courtesy of the local Waiheke Island tourist industry, which has attracted the attention of youngsters eager to try something different. The Club also attracted significant attention from South America in 2016 after it was featured on ESPN Argentina, who sent a film crew to the island to produce a documentary on why it had become so popular with South Americans.  The documentary lead to a very big following on the team's Facebook page from South American fans, resulting in the Team now having the third-largest Facebook following in New Zealand Football.

Supporters are generally very excited and bring colour, character and passion with them, singing, playing drums and generally having a very good time.  With between 50-80 supporters who travel to away games and they’ve put together banners, whistles and flags, streamers and more, providing for an atmosphere more typical at a European or South American venue.

References

External links
 Waiheke United AFC Official Website
 Waiheke United AFC Facebook Page

Northern League (New Zealand)
Association football clubs in Auckland
Waiheke Island
1987 establishments in New Zealand